Into the Light is the second album of Lebanese-German singer Fady Maalouf. It was released by Columbia Records and Sony BMG on 12 March 2010 in German-speaking Europe. Conceived after the major commercial success of hits debut album Blessed (2008) and its same-titled lead single, Maalouf worked with German producers Thorsten Brötzmann and Ivo Moring on the majority of its follow-up, with British musicians Tim Hawes and Obi Mhondera also contributing to the final track listing.

Upon its release, Into the Light reached number 33 on the German Albums Chart and number 42 on the Austrian Albums Chart but failed to chart in Switzerland. Its same-titled lead single entered the top fifty of the German Singles Chart. However, lackluster sales resulted into the termination of Maalouf's recording contract the following year, making Into the Light his final album with Columbia and Sony BMG.

Track listing 
Credits adapted from the liner notes of Into the Light.

Charts

References

2010 albums
Fady Maalouf albums